Turlough O'Donnell, PC (5 August 1924 – 21 April 2017) was an Irish lawyer and judge. He was a Lord Justice of Appeal of Northern Ireland from 1979 to 1989.

Biography 
O'Donnell was born in Newry to a Catholic family, the son of Charles and Eileen O'Donnell. He was educated at Abbey Grammar School, Newry and Queen's University Belfast, where he took a LLB. He was called to the Bar of Northern Ireland in 1947. He was appointed a Queen's Counsel in 1964. As a lawyer, he defended Robert McGladdery, the last man to be hanged in Northern Ireland.

In 1971, O'Donnell was appointed a Justice of the High Court of Northern Ireland. In 1979, he was promoted a Lord Justice of Appeal and was sworn of the Privy Council, having declined the customary knighthood. He retired in 1989.

O'Donnell was one of the few senior Catholic judges on the Northern Irish bench and he frequently came under threat. In 1979, he tried the Shankill Butchers and gave out 42 life sentences, a record in British legal history.

He was Chairman of the Northern Ireland Bar Council from 1970 to 1971 and of the Council of Legal Education (Northern Ireland) from 1980 to 1990.

Family 
O'Donnell married Eileen McKinley (died 2008) in 1954; they had two sons and two daughters. Of his sons, Turlough O'Donnell SC was Chairman of the General Council of the Bar of Ireland from 2016 to 2018, and Donal O'Donnell was directly appointed from the Irish Bar to the Supreme Court of Ireland in 2010, before becoming Chief Justice of Ireland in 2021.

References 

 https://www.irishnews.com/news/northernirelandnews/2017/04/22/news/turlough-o-donnell-judge-who-jailed-shankill-butchers-dies-after-a-life-courageously-lived--1004553/
 https://www.dundalkdemocrat.ie/news/obituaries/250290/obituary-renowned-judge-turlough-o-donnell-was-admired-and-respected-for-his-courage.html
 https://www.ukwhoswho.com/view/10.1093/ww/9780199540891.001.0001/ww-9780199540884-e-28756
 https://www.belfasttelegraph.co.uk/news/northern-ireland/senior-judge-turlough-odonnell-who-presided-over-notorious-troubles-trials-buried-35650459.html

Barristers from Northern Ireland
2017 deaths
People from Newry
Alumni of Queen's University Belfast
Northern Ireland King's Counsel
Members of the Privy Council of the United Kingdom
High Court judges of Northern Ireland
Lords Justice of Appeal of Northern Ireland